The revolving door policy ( or ) is the name for an alleged policy of the Palestinian Authority (PA).  Under this policy, the PA would arrest terror suspects in order to appease the international community and Israel, but then either release them, facilitate their escape, or move them to very comfortable conditions. The term was used by the Israeli, British, and United States governments.

Background

After the 1994 Oslo Accords, the Israel Defense Forces (IDF) withdrew from parts of the West Bank, ceding control to the newly constructed Palestinian Authority (PA) as the 'roadmap for peace' stipulated. PA control areas had those accused of giving Israel information about terrorist activity killed and, in general, the withdrawal caused Israel to lose its intelligence gathering capabilities concerning attacks originating from the West Bank. 

The agreements of the Oslo Accords included that the Israeli and PA intelligence apparatuses would collaborate with each other  and the PA was supposed to take over intelligence gathering in the areas under their control and report planned attacks to Israel. However, the PA was reluctant to give the Israelis information about pending attacks.  Israeli security forces continued to gather intelligence regarding pending terrorist attacks originating from PA control.  They passed this information to PA intelligence, requesting that the PA intercept the attackers.  The PA would frequently ignore the information, and at times, pass the information to the terrorists.

The PA also agreed to arrest members of Hamas and Islamic Jihad.

Policy

Despite the PA's reluctance to arrest suspected terrorists or report their plans to the Israeli security forces, they faced pressure from the international community and Israel to comply with their collaboration agreements.  From this was born the policy in which in order appease the international community and Israel, the PA would arrest the suspected terrorists, but then either release them, facilitate their escape, or move them to very comfortable conditions.

Example of policy's application

In December 2007, two members of Islamic Jihad drove up to three Israeli hikers and shot at them, killing two of them.   Immediately thereafter, the perpetrators turned themselves into the intelligence apparatus of the Palestinian Authority because they feared being arrested by the IDF. In January 2008, the two were sentenced to 15 years in prison by a PA court.  In March 2008, Ynet reported that the two were given furloughs by the PA, but when the Israeli government found out about the furloughs the PA asked them to return to prison. There were reports that one of the prisoners did not return from the furlough.

Origins of the term

The term was coined in 1996, soon after the replacement of the left-wing coalition of Jewish-Israeli and Arab-Israeli parties that led a process of negotiating with the Palestine Liberation Organization (PLO). It is believed that it was coined by new coalition leader, Israeli Prime Minister Benjamin Netanyahu. 

Netanyahu asserted that when Yasser Arafat, then the Chairman of the PLO, was pushed to show concessions he was fighting terrorism, "he would make some show of rounding up a few dozen people, putting them in what I call the revolving door so they come in and out of detention as fast, you know, in one rapid move.  I don't think he's done anything serious, I don’t think he’s going to do anything serious."  Netanyahu argued the policy exploited a weakness of the 1993 Oslo peace accords. The Israelis hoped Arafat would renounce terrorism, but more importantly, would also crack down on the terrorist operations of Hamas, Palestine Islamic Jihad, and other radical movements. The revolving door policy was one of the reasons stated by Netanyahu to freeze further withdrawal from territories. The Israeli government considered the revolving door policy to be a direct violation of the tit for tat policy.

Notable perspectives and usage

Perspective

Usage

The term was used by the Israeli, British, and United States governments.

See also
Revolving door syndrome

References

Israeli–Palestinian conflict
Law enforcement in the State of Palestine